Durandé is a Brazilian municipality located in the state of Minas Gerais. The city belongs to the mesoregion of Zona da Mata and to the microregion of Manhuaçu.  Districts within the county are St. John Figueira and São José da Figueira.

History
Dores do Rio José Pedro was a settlement in the municipality of Manhumirim, elevated to district in 1877. In 1890 the police station was elevated to the category of District of peace and in 1928 transferred its district headquarters to the town of Durandé.

Population
In the year 2000, Durandé had a population of 7,005.  Its estimated population in 2004 was 7,596 inhabitants. The population count conducted by IBGE in April 2007, however, found 6,932 inhabitants, as published in the Official Gazette in October 2007.  By 2010, the total population increased to 7,402.  Men numbered 3,761 and there were 3,641 females counted.  Areas considered urban accounted for 3,530 people, while 3,872 lived in rural areas.  As of 2020, the estimated population was 7,870.

Cultural Events
Durandé holds a Café festival on 20 September, with agricultural exhibitions, a milk competition, motocross, shows, rodeos, parades, auctions, a volleyball tournament, a rustic race and other cultural activities.

See also
 List of municipalities in Minas Gerais

References

   Territorial Division of Brazil and Territorial Limits Brazilian Institute of Geography and Statistics (IBGE) (1 July 2008). Visited on October 11, 2008. 
 IBGE (October 10., 2002). http://www.ibge.gov.br/home/geociencias/cartografia/default_territ_area.shtm  Official territorial area Resolution of the Presidency of the IBGE of No. 5 (R.PR-5/02). Visited on 5 December 2010. 2010. 
 https://web.archive.org/web/20110516205456/http://www.ibge.gov.br/home/estatistica/populacao/censo2010/populacao_por_municipio.shtm Population Census 2010 Brazilian Institute of Geography and Statistics (IBGE) (29 November 2010). Visited on 11 December 2010. 
 https://web.archive.org/web/20091003103229/http://www.pnud.org.br/atlas/ranking/IDH-M%2091%2000%20Ranking%20decrescente%20%28pelos%20dados%20de%202000%29.htm 91 00 Ranking decrescente (pelos dados de 2000).htm  Decreasing the HDI rank of municipalities in Brazil Atlas of Human Development United Nations Development Programme (UNDP) (2000). Visited on October 11, 2008. 
 http://www.ibge.gov.br/home/estatistica/economia/pibmunicipios/2004_2008/  Gross Domestic Product of Municipalities 2004-2008 Brazilian Institute of Geography and Statistics.  Visited on 11 December 2010.
 

Municipalities in Minas Gerais